Pish Bijar (also Romanized as Pīsh Bījār; also known as Lāt Maḩalleh) is a village in Amlash-e Shomali Rural District, in the Central District of Amlash County, Gilan Province, Iran. At the 2006 census, its population was 260, in 87 families.

References 

Populated places in Amlash County